Margaret Sarfo (pen name Peggy Oppong, née Odame; 26 January 1957 – 8 May 2014) was a Ghanaian author and journalist. She worked with the Graphic Communications Group Limited rising through the ranks to become the Editor of The Mirror.

Early life and education 
Sarfo was born in 1957 to Daniel Odame and his wife, of Mpraeso, Kwahu, in south Ghana. She attended primary schools in Adabraka, Accra, followed by the Okuapeman Secondary School, Akropong in 1971 where she attained the General Certificate of Education (GCE), Ordinary and Advanced levels.
She enrolled at the University of Ghana in 1979, graduating with a BA (Hons) in English and Russian. After a year studying in Russia, she returned to the University of Ghana and obtained a Graduate Diploma and MPhil degrees in Communication Studies...

Career 
Mrs Margaret Safo after completion joined the then Graphic Cooperation for her national service. She carried out her duties laudably and merited permanent employment as a staff writer in the 2nd January,1987. She earned the honor of becoming the Deputy Editor of The Mirror on 14th May,1998 and became the Editor on 2nd January, 2003 in due course. Mrs Margaret retired freely from the employment of the Graphics Communications Group in the year 2011 to write and publish her novels.

Selected works 
The dancing money box
End of the Tunnel
Red Heifer
Adventures of Cleopas
Julia's Dance
No Roses for Sharon
The Black Heel... a terrifying betrayal

Personal life 
She was married to Mr. Kojo Safo after meeting him during her school days at the University of Ghana and joined him later in Nigeria in 1982; where she taught English Language at the Methodist Comprehensive High School in Ekiti State. They returned to Ghana three years afterwards. She had for children;Mrs Sena Offei-Anim of Fidelity Bank, Tamale; Ms Sedina Safo of Peggy Oppong Books, Accra; Samuel Safo of the Kwame Nkrumah University of Science and Technology, Kumasi and Mrs Dela Bonsu, Graphic Communication Group Limited.

Death and Funeral 
Mrs Margaret Sarfo died at the 37 Military Hospital on May 8, 2014. She was laid to rest at the Osu Cemetery on Saturday, June 28. She left behind her husband and four children.

References 

Ghanaian journalists
University of Ghana alumni
1957 births
2014 deaths
Ghanaian women journalists